Racinaea spiculosa is a plant species in the genus Racinaea. This species is native to Bolivia, Brazil, Costa Rica, Venezuela and Ecuador.

Habits/ecology
The existence of this plant is relatively uncommon, and usually grows on the stems of old trees near the edge of rivers and streams.

References

spiculosa
Flora of Bolivia
Flora of Brazil
Flora of Costa Rica
Flora of Venezuela
Flora of Ecuador